Friends is the fourth studio album by English indie rock band White Lies. It was released by BMG on 7 October 2016 on digital download, vinyl LP and CD. A special box set was also issued via the band's website and official store containing two coloured cassettes, the first containing the album and the second with four bonus tracks on side C and four demos on side D. The box set also contained a download code on a "credit card" and a cheque-book style booklet with photos, lyrics and maze games.

Track listing

Personnel
 Harry McVeigh – lead vocals, guitar 
 Charles Cave – bass guitar, backing vocals
 Jack Lawrence-Brown – drums 
 Richard Wilkinson, White Lies - producer
 Phil Parsons - engineer
 John Davis - mastering
 David Wrench, Marta Salogni - mixing
 Markus Bagå – art direction, design  
 Big Active - creative director
 Steve Gullick - photography
 James Brown - recorded by

Charts

References

2016 albums
White Lies (band) albums